Eugen Freiherr von Lotzbeck (24 February 1882 in Munich – 22 May 1942 in Assenhausen, Starnberg) was a German horse rider who competed in the 1928 Summer Olympics.

In 1928 he and his horse Caracalla were part of the German dressage team which won the gold medal in the team dressage event after finishing eleventh in the individual dressage competition.

References

External links
profile

1882 births
1942 deaths
Sportspeople from Munich
German dressage riders
Olympic equestrians of Germany
Barons of Germany
Equestrians at the 1928 Summer Olympics
German male equestrians
Olympic gold medalists for Germany
Olympic medalists in equestrian
Medalists at the 1928 Summer Olympics